Taha Ismail (born 8 February 1939) is an Egyptian former footballer who played as a forward for Al-Ahly and the Egypt national team. He represented his country in the 1964 Summer Olympics.

After retiring, Ismail transitioned into managing the Saudi Arabia national team between 1972 and 1974, and two short spells managing the Egypt national football team.

Honours
 Africa Cup of Nations: 1959

References

External links
 
 

1939 births
Living people
Egyptian footballers
Association football forwards
Egypt international footballers
Al Ahly SC players
1959 African Cup of Nations players
1962 African Cup of Nations players
1963 African Cup of Nations players
Olympic footballers of Egypt
Footballers at the 1964 Summer Olympics
Egyptian football managers
Al-Ahli Saudi FC managers
Ismaily SC managers
Africa Cup of Nations-winning players
1994 African Cup of Nations managers
Egyptian Premier League players
Al-Wehda Club (Mecca) managers
Expatriate football managers in Saudi Arabia
Egyptian expatriate sportspeople in Saudi Arabia
20th-century Egyptian people